Fouquieria diguetii, known by the common names Adam's tree and palo Adán, is a plant in the family Fouquieriaceae native to the southern half of the Baja California Peninsula, and the coasts of Sonora and Sinaloa. It is a semi-succulent and deciduous plant related to the ocotillo and the Boojum tree. It is distinguished by its bright red, tubular flowers, a shrub to small tree habit, and conical, paniculate inflorescences.

Description

Morphology 
This plant is a deciduous shrub arising from a short, thick trunk with branches covered in spines. It grows between 1.8 to 3 meters tall. The leaves are dark green and elliptic, and can be up to 2 cm long. The flowers are bright red in color, and attract hummingbirds.

Taxonomy 
The chromosome number is 2n = 48.

Taxonomic history 
This species was described in 1899 by Philippe Van Tieghem as Bronnia digueti and as Bronnia thiebauti. George Valentine Nash described this plant as Fouquieria peninsularis. In 1925, Ivan M. Johnston combined all of these names under the current one, Fouquieria diguetii. However, it is written in his description as F. digueti.

Etymology 
This species is named for Leon Diguet, a French naturalist who traveled throughout Baja California.

Distribution and habitat 

This plant may be found from the vicinity of El Crucero in southern Baja California into the cape of the Baja California Sur, and on the surrounding islands in the gulf, and the Santa Margarita and Magdalena Islands on the Pacific coast. It is also found on some parts of the coast of Sonora and Sinaloa, facing the Gulf of California.

This species is common throughout its range. On Montserrat Island in the Gulf of California, it can be found on marine terraces and escarpments.

Phenology and biology 
There is a considerable amount of variation in the growth habit and inflorescence length over the distribution of this species. Plants in the Sonoran Desert typically only reach 1 to 3 meters in height at maturity, while mature plants in the southern tropical region may commonly exceed 4 meters in height. The length of the inflorescence is dependent on the moisture available at the time of development, meaning plants in the arid part of the range have inflorescences that average 5.1 cm in length, while in the tropical parts of the range the inflorescence may average 11.5 cm in length. Inflorescences produced in the dry season tend to be much shorter than those produced in the wet seasons.

Pollination is primarily from hummingbirds, who are attracted to the long, red, tubular flowers.

References 

Flora of Baja California
Flora of Baja California Sur
Flora of Sonora
Flora of Sinaloa
diguetii